The Lärchwandschrägaufzug is an incline elevator (inclinator) that is located in the High Tauern National Park, Kaprun, Austria.

Technical features
In 1952 it was rebuilt with the current gauge. It is also used to transport people, mostly tourists.

References

Transport in Austria
Broad gauge railways by size